The Diavolezza is a col and ski resort above the Val Bernina in Graubünden.

From Diavolezza one can see the highest peaks of the Eastern Alps, including the Piz Bernina, and the Pers Glacier, a tributary of the Morteratsch Glacier.

Tourism 
The mountain can be reached by cable car from Val Bernina, the Bernina Pass valley. At the base station of the cable car on  there is the Bernina Diavolezza railway station on the Bernina Line of the Rhaetian Railway (RhB)).

The Diavolezza is one of the ski areas of the Upper Engadine (from 1,896 m to 3,066 m). The skiing area is connected to that of Piz Lagalb, which lies on the opposite side of the valley. The two areas are usually promoted as one, called Diavolezza-Lagalb. The Diavolezza-Lagalb area is known for its difficult slopes, all red and black, as well as the good snow conditions lasting often as long as May. Especially popular is the difficult  slope down the Morteratsch Glacier to the Morteratsch railway station (the slope on the glacier is marked and secured).

Each month at full moon, there is moonlight skiing in the evening.

Panorama

References

External links 

 Diavolezza
 Current weather and forecasts for the Diavolezza

Bernina Range
Engadin
Mountains of the Alps
Mountains of Switzerland
Tourist attractions in Switzerland
Cable cars in Switzerland
Mountains of Graubünden
Two-thousanders of Switzerland
Pontresina